The 2010 Zuiderduin Masters was a BDO/WDF darts tournament that took place in Egmond aan Zee, Netherlands.

Ross Montgomery won the men's title, beating Robbie Green 5-4 in sets having been 4-0 down.

Qualifying 
The players in bold are the seeded players for the group stages in the men's event and the knockout stages in the women's event. Steve West and Deta Hedman (in italics) qualified through more than one method.

Men

Women

Results

Men's tournament

Group stage 

All matches best of 9 legs. Two points are gained for every match won. P = Played; W = Won; L = Lost; LF = Legs for; LA = Legs against; +/- = Leg difference; Pts = Points

Group A

Tony West 5-3 John Henderson 
 
Ross Montgomery (1) 5-3 John Henderson

Ross Montgomery (1) 5-2 Tony West

Group B

Stuart Kellett 5-3 Gino Vos

Scott Mitchell (8) 5-2 Gino Vos 
 
Stuart Kellett 5-3 Scott Mitchell (8)

Group C

Tony O'Shea 5-4 John Walton

Alan Norris (5) 5-4 John Walton

Tony O'Shea 5-0 Alan Norris (5)

Group D

Ted Hankey 5-0 Joey ten Berge

Joey ten Berge  5-3 Garry Thompson (4)

Garry Thompson (4) 5-4 Ted Hankey

Group E

Gary Robson 5-4 Willy van de Wiel

Steve West (3) 5-4 Willy van de Wiel

Gary Robson 5-2 Steve West (3)

Group F

Robbie Green  5-3 Steve Douglas

Steve Douglas 5-1 Darryl Fitton (6)

Robbie Green 5-3 Darryl Fitton (6)

Group G

Scott Waites 5-3 Dave Prins

Dean Winstanley (7) 5-2 Dave Prins

Dean Winstanley (7) 5-0 Scott Waites

Group H

Wesley Harms 5-3 Jan Dekker

Martin Adams (2) 5-1 Jan Dekker

Martin Adams (2) 5-1 Wesley Harms

Knockout stages

Women's tournament

References

Finder Darts Masters
Zuiderduin Masters
Zuiderduin Masters